John Chu is a Taiwanese American microprocessor architect, science fiction writer and literary translator.

Life and career
Chu was born in Taiwan, moved to the US and began learning English at age six. He read voraciously as a child and was inspired to write science fiction by the works of Ted Chiang. He has attended the Viable Paradise and Clarion science fiction & fantasy writing workshops.

In 2014 Chu won the Hugo Award for Best Short Story with the story The Water That Falls on You from Nowhere. Chu also reads for podcasts and translates novels and stories from Chinese into English.

Bibliography

Short fiction

References

External links
Official site
John Chu's bibliography. Many of his stories are available free online.
"John Chu", Tor.com, September 2014

Living people
Hugo Award-winning writers
Year of birth missing (living people)
Place of birth missing (living people)
American science fiction writers
Asimov's Science Fiction people
American people of Taiwanese descent
American male short story writers
Taiwanese emigrants to the United States